Louisenhöhe may refer to two different villages in Poland called Louisenhöhe in German:

 Będzin, West Pomeranian Voivodeship, a village in northwestern Poland
 Stradzewo, Lubusz Voivodeship, a village of 30 in western Poland